was a junior college in Kakogawa, Hyōgo, Japan.

History 
The junior college was founded in 1951. It offered courses in agriculture and horticulture. In 1966, it was merged into Kobe University to become that institution's Faculty of Agriculture.

References

External links 
 

Educational institutions established in 1951
Japanese junior colleges
Public universities in Japan
Universities and colleges in Hyōgo Prefecture
1951 establishments in Japan